Library Literature and Information Science  is a bibliographic database that indexes over 410 library and information science periodicals published internationally. It also covers books, chapters within books, library school theses, and pamphlets. In 2011, the H. W. Wilson Company, the firm that created the index, sold it to EBSCO Publishing along with other H.W. Wilson indexes and databases.

Coverage
Bibliographical indexing from 1984 to present. Full-text coverage from 1997, but start date varies for each publication.

References

External links

Homepage

Other important databases covering library and information science
Dissertations Abstracts
ERIC
INSPEC
 Library and Information Science Abstracts (LISA)
Library, Information Science & Technology Abstracts
Social Sciences Citation Index
Web of Science

Library and information science journals
Bibliographic databases and indexes
EBSCO Industries